Tiago Pereira (born 1975) is a retired Portuguese football defensive midfielder.

Tiago Pereira may also refer to:
 Tiago Pereira (athlete) (born 1993), Portuguese triple jumper
 Tiago Pereira (handballer) (born 1989), Portuguese handball player
 T. J. Pereira (born 1976), Brazilian jockey
 Tiago Pereira (footballer, born 1990), Portuguese football forward
 Lima Pereira (footballer, born 1994) (born 1994), Portuguese football defender, full name Tiago Miguel da Silva Vilela Lima Pereira 
Tiago Pereira (footballer, born 1995), Portuguese football goalkeeper

See also
 Thiago Pereira (born 1986), Brazilian swimmer
 Thiago Pereira (footballer) (born 1984), Brazilian football defender